William B. Cragin Jr. (September 21, 1876 – September 16, 1943) was an American tennis player active in the early 20th century.

Tennis career
Cragin reached the quarterfinals of the U.S. National Championships in 1909 and 1910, having to qualify in the former via the preliminary round. In 1911 and 1912 he was runner-up in singles at the U.S. National Indoor Championships.

References

External links

American male tennis players
1876 births
1943 deaths
Tennis people from Connecticut